The Symphony No. 1 by Alfred Schnittke was composed between 1969 and 1974. It is scored for a large orchestra. The symphony is recognised as one of Schnittke's most extreme essays in aleatoric music. From the outset the piece is loud, brash, and chaotic, and it quotes motifs from all parts of the Western classical tradition.

Schnittke includes a choreography for the musicians themselves, and in a manner similar to Haydn's Farewell Symphony, they leave and re-enter the stage at points marked in the score.

Music 
The symphony is in four movements:

The second movement opens with a faux-Baroque rondo which is soon usurped by a Mahlerian intervention on clarinet. This too is soon eclipsed by a sleazy percussive theme. There are also direct quotations from Tchaikovsky's B-minor Piano Concerto, Johann Strauss Jr's 'Vienna Woods' waltz, Chopin's Second Piano Sonata amongst many others. Often the material collides in a manner similar to Charles Ives' music, but as the critic Alex Ross notes, taken to a much greater extreme. Schnittke also includes an extended jazz improvisation sequence for violin and piano in the second movement.

Ross regards it as surprising that the work was ever passed by the Soviet authorities, even though by the 1970s the regime had become less hardline. Schnittke himself noted:

Somehow, Ross notes, the authorities saw this as an endorsement of the Soviet regime. He argues that in this piece:

The symphony was premiered on 9 February 1974, in Gorky (Nizhny Novgorod). The Gorky Philharmonic Orchestra was conducted by Gennady Rozhdestvensky. The work was published (at least for rental) in 1978. Rozhdestvensky recorded the work in 1987 with the USSR Ministry of Culture Symphony Orchestra for Melodiya Records. A further recording with the Royal Stockholm Philharmonic Orchestra under Leif Segerstam was released in 1994 on BIS Records, and Rozhdestvensky re-recorded the work in 1988 with the Russian State Symphony Orchestra, available on Chandos Records.

Schnittke's score was used by John Neumeier in his 1983 ballet Endstation Sehnsucht (A Streetcar Named Desire, based on the Tennessee Williams play of the same name). Given the resources required to perform the music, a tape recording was used instead of a live orchestra.

Instrumentation
The symphony is scored for a large orchestra:

Woodwinds
 4 flute
 4 oboes
 4 clarinets
 3 saxophones
 4 bassoons

Brass
 4 horns
 4 trumpets
 4 trombones
 1 tuba

Percussion
 timpani
 xylophone
 vibraphone
 marimbaphone
 tubular bells
 bass drum
 snare drum
 tom-toms
 glockenspiel
 tam-tam

Keyboards
 celesta
 piano
 harpsichord
 organ

Strings
 electric guitar
 bass guitar
 2 harps

 strings

References

1974 compositions
Symphonies by Alfred Schnittke